The Lezginka (Tat: Ləzgihəngi;  or ) is the collective name originally given by Russians to all Caucasian dances united by fast  rhythm. It can be solo male or pair dance. The melody is clear and dynamic, the pace is fast. A common mistake attributes it only to Lezgin people. However, until the end of 19th century, Russians used name "Lezgin" as the common name for all highlanders of Dagestan., as well as Chechnya, Ingushetia and Northern Azerbaijan.

According to Encyclopædia Britannica:

References

External links 

 Video: Lezgi sample – folk dance Lezginka by the Azerbaijani ensemble "Suvar"

European folk dances
Russian folk dances
Lezgins
Culture of the Caucasus